Ancer Lee Haggerty (born August 26, 1944) is an inactive Senior United States district judge of the United States District Court for the District of Oregon. At the time of his nomination to the federal bench by President Clinton in 1993, he was serving as an Oregon circuit court judge.

Early life and education

Born in Vanport, Oregon, Haggerty graduated from the University of Oregon with a Bachelor of Science degree in 1967, and after service in the United States Marine Corps from 1967 to 1970, entered Hastings College of Law of the University of California, earning a Juris Doctor in 1973.

Career

Haggerty was a law clerk for the Metropolitan Public Defender in Portland, Oregon in 1973. He was a staff attorney of Metropolitan Public Defender in Portland from 1973 to 1977. He was in private practice of law in Portland from 1977 to 1988. He was a judge to the Multnomah County District Court, Oregon from 1989 to 1990. He was a judge to the Multnomah County Circuit Court, Oregon from 1990 to 1993.

Federal judicial service

Haggerty was a United States District Judge of the United States District Court for the District of Oregon. Haggerty was nominated by President William J. Clinton on November 19, 1993, to a seat vacated by Owen M. Panner. He was confirmed by the United States Senate on March 25, 1994, and received commission on March 28, 1994. He served as chief judge from 2002 to 2009. He took senior status on August 26, 2009, and took inactive senior status at the end of 2014, meaning that he remains a member of the court, but no longer hears cases or participates in court business.

Notable case

Haggerty was the presiding judge in the trial of White Aryan Resistance (WAR) founder and leader, Tom Metzger, over his involvement in the 1988 murder of Mulugeta Seraw by skinhead members of Portland's East Side White Pride.

See also 
 List of African-American federal judges
 List of African-American jurists
 List of first minority male lawyers and judges in Oregon

References

External links

U.S. District Court for the District of Oregon (Official website)

1944 births
African-American judges
African-American United States Navy personnel
Judges of the United States District Court for the District of Oregon
Living people
Military personnel from Oregon
Oregon state court judges
United States district court judges appointed by Bill Clinton
United States Marines
University of California, Hastings College of the Law alumni
University of Oregon alumni
20th-century American judges
21st-century American judges
African Americans in the Vietnam War
20th-century African-American people
Public defenders